"A Summer Song" is a 1964 song by the English pop music duo Chad & Jeremy. The song was written by duo partner Chad Stuart with Clive Metcalfe and Keith Noble.

Background
Like the duo's breakthrough selection, "Yesterday's Gone," "A Summer Song" is a reminiscence of a summer romance. However, "A Summer Song" eschews the Merseybeat sound of "Yesterday's Gone" in favour of a gentler folk-influenced arrangement, with the lyrics also being wistful in tone.

Stuart recalled on The Steel Pier Radio Show that his "A Summer Song" collaborators, Clive Metcalfe and Keith Noble, were a musical duo (linked to Pink Floyd) with whom he and Clyde had become friendly and that "A Summer Song" was written and composed in Stuart's flat in London: "We were sitting around jamming on four chords and we came up with 'A Summer Song.'" Clive Metcalfe however wrote the tune late one night and Keith later added lyrics.  Clive says "We performed it one night at Tina's (a Bistro in Piccadilly London) when Chad was visiting.  Chad liked the song and later re-wrote the middle, and we all reworked the lyrics, as you hear it today". "We never thought 'Summer Song' could possibly be a single," Chad recalled another time. "It was just a pretty, romantic song. Or so we thought...you never can tell, can you?"

The selection was one of a number to be included on the Yesterday's Gone album recorded at CTS Studios Bayswater in June 1964 under the production auspices of Shel Talmy, with Johnnie Spence conducting the orchestra.

"A Summer Song" was issued in both the UK and the U.S. in July 1964; the UK single version opens with Chad and Jeremy trading vocals while the U.S. single features unisonant singing throughout.

Impact
"A Summer Song" was played on Juke Box Jury where guest judge Ringo Starr assessed the track as a "miss" (i.e., flop) with no U.S. hit potential. Indeed, in the UK – where Chad & Jeremy's "Yesterday's Gone" had been a rather mild hit, followed by the unsuccessful "Like I Love You Today" – "A Summer Song" did not reach the charts. This was possibly due to the fact that it was released on a very small label and was largely unobtainable in the shops. There was an article in New Musical Express complaining of this fact. However in, the United States –  following the near-Top 20 success of "Yesterday's Gone" – the track afforded the duo their career record, reaching #7 on the Billboard Hot 100 the week of 17–24 October 1964. "A Summer Song" also went to #2 for six weeks on the Adult Contemporary chart. It is considered one of the signature songs of the British Invasion. When Gary James asked him about it, Stuart suggested: "The American market was bigger. [...] You'd never hear something that sweet in the British charts. [...] For some reason in America it worked."

"A Summer Song" also reached #7 in Canada and #49 in Australia. The selection is featured on the soundtracks of the films Rushmore (1998), The Princess Diaries (2001), and Men in Black 3 (2012), and was used in the "ESPN's Sports Heaven" commercial that aired during Super Bowl XL. It appears in a 2019 TV commercial for Coors Light.

Remakes
The Lettermen covered "A Summer Song" for their August 1965 Capitol Records album release The Hit Sounds of the Lettermen produced by Steve Douglas. The Lettermen made a second recording of the song for "Alive" Again...Naturally, a 1973 Capitol Records release which the group self-produced with Ed Cobb. Both versions of "A Summer Song" by the Lettermen abridged the original three word title to "Summer Song."

Skeeter Davis's RCA Victor album release Singin' in the Summer Sun, which Chet Atkins and Felton Jarvis produced, included Davis' version of "A Summer Song;" the album was recorded in January 1966 at RCA Victor Studio in Nashville, Tennessee for release that June.

In the summer of 1967, the Doodletown Pipers had an Easy Listening hit with their remake of "A Summer Song;" produced by Stu Phillips, this Epic Records release reached No. 29 on the Easy Listening charts, affording the group their only chart appearance. Also in 1967, the Memories, an Irish group who became a top showband attraction and scored eight domestic chart hits, remade "A Summer Song" as their debut single, released on Rex Records.

A version of "A Summer Song"1 by Laila Kinnunen was issued by Mediamusiikki in 2000 on the compilation CD Muistojen Kyyneleet, which featured selections Kinnunen had recorded with the Erkki Melakoski (fi) orchestra for the Yleisradio TV series Kuukauden Suositut, Kinnunen's performance of "A Summer Song" having been prepped to air in that series' 1966 season.

The 1998 Narada album Songs From an English Garden by David Lanz features an instrumental version of A Summer Song.

New York based folkie Christine Lavin included the song on her 1986 LP Beau Woes and Other Problems of Modern Life.

A French rendering of "A Summer Song" entitled "Souviens-toi des nuits d'été" was introduced in 1965 by Frank Alamo on the Rivièra label; the B-side of Alamo's single "Qu'est-ce Que Peut Bien Faire Un Garçon," "Souviens-toi des nuits d'été" was also included on a four track EP and was subsequently included on the singer's 1966 self-titled album release. "Souviens-toi des nuits d'été" was also recorded by Line Renaud, her rendition being included on a four track 1966 EP release by Disques Line.

A Finnish rendering of "A Summer Song" entitled "Kesämuisto"1 was recorded by Eero ja Jussi & the Boys (fi) for their 1991 Audiovox Records album release 3 Kitaraa (fi), and the selection was one of several on the album recorded at Ogeli Recording Studio between January and February 1991.

American indie rock band Surfer Blood released a cover of the song on their 2017 album Covers.

1The Laila Kinnunen recording of "A Summer Song" is subtitled "Kesämuisto;" however, the track is sung in its original English format.

References

Sources

1964 singles
Chad & Jeremy songs
Song recordings produced by Shel Talmy
Songs written by Chad Stuart
1964 songs